Yevgeny Pavlovich Leonov (2 September 1926 – 29 January 1994) was a Soviet and Russian actor who played main parts in several of the most famous Soviet films, such as Gentlemen of Fortune, Mimino and Striped Trip. Called "one of Russia's best-loved actors", he also provided the voice for many Soviet cartoon characters, including Vinny Pukh (Winnie-the-Pooh).

Early life
While growing up in a typical Moscow family, he dreamed of becoming a war-plane pilot, which was a very common desire of many boys of the World War II period. This is also often attributed to the fact that his father worked in an airplane factory. During the Great Patriotic War he and his whole family worked in a weapon manufacturing/aviation factory. After the war, he joined the Moscow Art Theatre school, where he studied under Mikhail Yanshin.

Career
In his first film, Leonov was cast as an extra and did not receive any recognition. He later became Georgiy Daneliya's regular, appearing in all of his features, including Gentlemen of Fortune, Autumn Marathon, Mimino, Afonya and Kin-dza-dza!. According to the Allmovie, "his short, round stature, expressive eyes, broad and open face, slow movements, and slightly slurred speech made him ideal for the comic roles in which he specialized". But he also attracted critical notice for his tragic parts and the invariable naturalness of his acting. Many notable actors were said to avoid appearing in the same films with Leonov, for his natural manner of acting made them seem strained.

Despite Leonov's brief appearance in Daneliya's Autumn Marathon (1980) (one of his most popular films), the role won him the Best Actor at the Venice Film Festival. In Autumn Marathon, it is said, Leonov brilliantly demonstrates the typical Leonov anti-hero. He gave a hilarious portrayal of a simple, nosey man who drank too much and who adored nothing more than talking nonsense as long as anyone could stand it. Among the other films he was instrumental in raising to the classic level were Gentlemen of Fortune and Belorussian Station, both made in 1971. Like all of Leonov's movies, they are frequently rerun on television. Reportedly, "Leonov was to Russians what Fernandel was to the French." He performed over 200 roles and was the Russian cinema's best-known supporting actor.

In 1991 (or in 1988), when touring in Germany, he suffered a massive heart attack, which put him into a coma for 10 days (or 16 days). His life was saved only after major surgery and Leonov recovered – only to begin a schedule of performances at the Lenkom Theatre.

In 1993, a year before his death, Leonov was asked during a film festival "What years in the Russian theatre's life were the most productive?" Leonov replied:

Leonov died on 29 January 1994 on his way to the Lenkom Theatre to perform in The Prayer for the Dead (A Memorial Prayer). When his death was announced in the auditorium, the audience spontaneously flooded into the church across the road and lit candles in mourning. Over half a million people turned out in freezing conditions for a procession to a memorial service. He is buried in Novodevichy Cemetery in Moscow near other outstanding figures of Russian culture.

Filmography
Actor

Happy Flight (Счастливый рейс) (1949) as Firefighter (uncredited)
Sporting Honour (Спортивная честь) (1951) as Waiter (uncredited)
Submarine chaser (Морской охотник) (1954) as cook
Road (Дорога) (1955) as driver Pasha Yeskov
Criminal Case of Rumyantsev (Дело Румянцева) (1956) as driver Mikhail Snegiryov
A Unique Spring (Неповторимая весна) (1957) as Alexey Koshelev
The street is full of surprises (Улица полна неожиданностей) (1958) as Yevgeniy Pavlovich Serdyukov
Difficult happiness (Трудное счастье) (1958) as Agathon
Tale of newlyweds (Повесть о молодожёнах) (1959) as Fedor
Ne imey 100 rubley... (Не имей сто рублей...) (1959) as Ivan S. Mukhin
Povest o molodozhyonakh (1960) as Fedya
Artwork (Произведение искусства) (196, Short) as Sasha Smirnov
Snow tale (Снежная сказка) (1959) as Old Year
Striped Trip (Полосатый рейс) (1961) as Gleb Shuleykin
Cheremushki (Черёмушки) (1962) as Barabashkin
Serf actress (Крепостная актриса) (1963) as Count Ivan P. Kutaisov
Short humoresques (Короткие истории) (1963, TV Movie) as client
Don Tale (Донская повесть) (1964) as Yakov Shibalok
Thirty Three (Тридцать три) (1965) as Ivan S. Travkin
Nad nami Yuzhnyy Krest (1965) as Disabled-seller in the market
The Snow Queen (Снежная королева) (1967) as King Erik XXIX
Parviyat kurier (1968) as Kritski
Illusionist (Фокусник) (1968) as Stepan Nikolaevich Rossomakhin
Do not be sad (Не горюй!) (1968) as soldier Yegor Zaletayev
Zigzag udachi (Зигзаг удачи) (1968) as photographer Vladimir Oreshnikov
Literature lesson (Урок литературы) (1968) as Pavel Vronsky, Nina's father
Virineya (Виринея) (1969) as Michael
Carrousel (Карусель) (1969, TV Series) as Ivan I. Nyukhin (voice)
Tchaikovsky (Чайковский) (1970) as Alyosha
Shine, shine, my star (Гори, гори, моя звезда) (1970) as Pasha, the master illusion
Between high spikes (Меж высоких хлебов) (1970) as Pavlo Struchok
Belorussian Station (Белорусский вокзал) (1971) as Ivan Prikhodko
Gentlemen of Fortune (Джентльмены удачи) (1971) as Yevgeny Ivanovich Troshkin / Dotsent
As Ilf and Petrov rode a tram (Ехали в трамвае Ильф и Петров) (1972) as Vitaly Kapitulov
Big School-Break (Большая перемена) (1972, TV Mini-Series) as Lednyov
Racers (Гонщики) (1973) as Ivan M. Kukushkin
Hopelessly Lost (Совсем пропащий) (1973) as rogue nicknamed "The King"
Under a stone sky (Под каменным небом) (1974) as Senior lieutenant Kravtsov
Bonus (Премия) (1974) as Vasily T. Potapov
Afonya (Афоня) (1975) as Kolya
Circus in the Circus (Соло для слона с оркестром) (1975) as circus director Ivanov
Step towards (Шаг навстречу) (1976) as Serafim Nikitich
The Elder Son (Старший сын) (1976, TV Movie) as Andrei Grigorievich Sarafanov
Legend about Till Eulenspiegel (Легенда о Тиле) (1977) as Lamme Goedzak
Long criminal case (Длинное, длинное дело) (1977) as Mikhail P. Luzhin
Mimino (Мимино) (1977) as Volokhov
Funny people! (Смешные люди!) (1977) as chorister Aleksei Alekseyevich
Marriage (Женитьба) (1978) as Baltazar Baltazarovich Zhevakin
Chaperon (Дуэнья) (1978, TV Movie) as Don Izokelyo Mendoso
An Ordinary Miracle (Обыкновенное чудо) (1978, TV Movie) as King
And it's all about him (И это всё о нём) (1978) as Police Captain Aleksandr M. Prokhorov
Autumn Marathon (Осенний марафон) (1979) as Vasily Ignatyevich Kharitonov, sosed Buzykina
Faithfully (Верой и правдой) (1979) as Evgeny S. Bannikov
Holidays in September (Отпуск в сентябре) (1979, TV Movie) as Vladimir Andreevich Kushak
Borrowing Matchsticks (За спичками) (1980) as Antti Ihalainen
Say a Word for the Poor Hussar (О бедном гусаре замолвите слово) (1981, TV Movie) as provincial actor Afanasy P. Bubentsov
The House that Swift Built (Дом, который построил Свифт) (1982, TV Movie) as giant Glyum
Tears Were Falling (Слёзы капали) (1983) as Pavel Ivanovich Vasin
Unique (Уникум) (1983) as director
Time and the Conways (Время и семья Конвей) (1984) as Alan Conway, twenty years later
Kin-dza-dza! (Кин-дза-дза!) (1986) as Wef the Chatlanian, a wandering singer
To Kill a Dragon (Убить Дракона) (1988) as burgomaster
Passport (Паспорт) (1990) as official of Soviet Embassy in Austria
Detective bureau "Felix" (Детективное агентство "Феликс") (1993) as uncle Vanya
Amerikanskiy dedushka (Американский дедушка) (1993) as Gogolev
Nastya (Настя) (1993) as Yakov Alekseyevich

Voice actor
Winnie-the-Pooh
Winnie-the-Pooh Pays a Visit
Winnie-the-Pooh and a Busy Day
Vasilisa the Beautiful
The Adventures of Lolo the Penguin
Welcome
Laughter and Grief by the White Sea

References

External links

Website about Leonov

1926 births
1994 deaths
20th-century Russian male actors
Male actors from Moscow
Communist Party of the Soviet Union members
Honored Artists of the RSFSR
People's Artists of the RSFSR
People's Artists of the USSR
Recipients of the Lenin Komsomol Prize
Recipients of the Order of Lenin
Recipients of the USSR State Prize
Recipients of the Vasilyev Brothers State Prize of the RSFSR
State Prize of the Russian Federation laureates
Russian male film actors
Russian male stage actors
Russian male television actors
Russian male voice actors
Soviet male film actors
Soviet male stage actors
Soviet male television actors
Soviet male voice actors
Burials at Novodevichy Cemetery